John Louis Edwin Clubbe (February 21, 1938 – February 24, 2022) was an American academic. He was an emeritus professor of English at the University of Kentucky.

Biography 
Clubbe received his B.A., M.A., and Ph.D. from Columbia University. He also attended the University of Paris in 1966. He taught at Duke University and the University of Kentucky from 1976 to 1999 and is an expert on English Romanticism, especially the works of Lord Byron. He was a longtime president of the International Association of Byron Societies and the Byron Society of America, where he was chair from 1974 through 1999.

Clubbe received a Guggenheim Fellowship in 1975 as well as a National Endowment for the Humanities Fellowship into Thomas Carlyle.

He died on February 24, 2022, at age 84.

Bibliography 

 Victorian Forerunner: The Later Career of Thomas Hood (1968)
 Selected Poems of Thomas Hood (1970), editor
 Two Reminiscences of Thomas Carlyle (1974), editor
 Nineteenth Century Literary Perspectives (1974), editor
 Carlyle and His Contemporaries (1977), editor
 Froude's Life of Carlyle (1979), editor
 Byron et la Suisse (1982)
 English Romanticism: The Grounds of Belief (co-author with Ernest J. Lovell, 1983)
 Victorian Perspectives: Six Essays (co-author with Jerome Meckier, 1989)
 Cincinnati Observed: Architecture and History (1992)
 Beethoven: The Relentless Revolutionary (2019)

References 

Columbia College (New York) alumni
Columbia Graduate School of Arts and Sciences alumni
University of Paris alumni
University of Kentucky faculty
Fellows of the National Endowment for the Humanities
2022 deaths
1938 births
American academics of English literature